Sphyrocoris is a genus of shield-backed bugs in the family Scutelleridae. There are at least two described species in Sphyrocoris.

Species
These two species belong to the genus Sphyrocoris:
 Sphyrocoris obliquus (Germar, 1839)
 Sphyrocoris punctellus (Stål, 1862)

References

Further reading

External links

Scutelleridae
Articles created by Qbugbot